The 1991 SANFL season was the 112th season of the highest level Australian rules football Competition in South Australia.Woodville and West Torrens merged at the end of the 1990 season resulting in the competition reducing from 10 to 9 clubs.

Minor Rounds

Round 1

Ladder

Grand final

References 

SANFL
South Australian National Football League seasons